Stewart McCrae (1919 – 5 June 2008) was an Australian cartoonist who contributed to the Brisbane Courier Mail newspaper and bulletin. For the Argus (Melbourne) he published the cartoon Nicky & Graham.

References

External links
 Interview with Stewart McCrae, cartoonist (1998 sound recording) - interviewered by Ann Turner
 Killen in company / Jim Killen with cartoons by Stewart McCrae (1989)
 Crawley's funny business / Stewart McCrae (1989)
 Stewart McCrae cartoon collection - held and digitised by the National Library of Australia

1919 births
2008 deaths
Australian editorial cartoonists